The 15th Hollywood Film Awards were held on October 24, 2011. The ceremony took place at The Beverly Hilton Hotel in Beverly Hills, California.

Winners
 Best Actor: George Clooney – The Descendants
 Best Actress: Michelle Williams – My Week with Marilyn
 Best Supporting Actor: Christopher Plummer – Beginners
 Best Supporting Actress: Carey Mulligan – Shame
 Breakthrough Actor Award: Joseph Gordon-Levitt – 50/50
 Breakthrough Actress Award: Jessica Chastain – The Tree of Life, Take Shelter, The Help, The Debt, and Coriolanus
 Breakthrough Director: Michel Hazanavicius – The Artist
 Best Director: Bennett Miller – Moneyball
 Best Producer: Letty Aronson – Midnight in Paris
 Best Editor: Stephen Mirrione – The Ides of March
 Best Screenwriter: Diablo Cody – Young Adult
 Best Composer: Alberto Iglesias – The Skin I Live In
 Best Visual Effects: Scott Farrar – Transformers: Dark Side of the Moon
 Best Cinematographer: Emmanuel Lubezki – The Tree of Life
 Best Animation: Gore Verbinski – Rango
 Best Production Design: James J. Murakami – Heareafter
 Best Movie: Harry Potter and the Deathly Hallows – Part 2
 New Hollywood Award: Felicity Jones
 Career Achievement Award: Glenn Close
 Best Ensemble Cast: Viola Davis, Jessica Chastain, Emma Stone, Octavia Spencer, Allison Janney, Bryce Dallas Howard, Mary Steenburgen, Ahna O'Reilly, and Cicely Tyson – The Help
 Spotlight Award: Amber Heard – The Rum Diary, Bérénice Bejo – The Artist, Elle Fanning – Super 8, Jean Dujardin – The Artist, Andrea Riseborough – W.E., Anton Yelchin – Like Crazy, Shailene Woodley – The Descendants

References

External links
 

Hollywood
2011 in California
Hollywood Film Awards
2011 in American cinema